Ash Coulee is a valley in the U.S. state of South Dakota.

Ash Coulee named for the ash trees in the coulee.

References

Landforms of Butte County, South Dakota
Landforms of Harding County, South Dakota
Valleys of South Dakota